Mauri Taisto Heikki Seppä (11 March 1916, Teuva - 8 November 2000) was a Finnish agronomist, farmer and politician. He was a member of the Parliament of Finland from 1954 to 1962 and again from 1970 to 1975, representing the National Coalition Party.

References

1916 births
2000 deaths
People from Teuva
People from Vaasa Province (Grand Duchy of Finland)
Finnish Lutherans
National Coalition Party politicians
Members of the Parliament of Finland (1954–58)
Members of the Parliament of Finland (1958–62)
Members of the Parliament of Finland (1970–72)
Members of the Parliament of Finland (1972–75)
20th-century Lutherans